The Post is an English-language newspaper in South Africa owned by Independent News & Media and published in Durban, South Africa.

Distribution areas

Distribution figures

Readership figures

See also
 List of newspapers in South Africa

References

External links
 Post website
 SAARF website

Mass media in Durban
Newspapers published in South Africa
Publications with year of establishment missing